Algernon Sidney Buford (January 2, 1826 – May 6, 1911) was a Virginian businessman, politician, and lawyer best known for his 22-year presidency of the Richmond and Danville Railroad, during which he was responsible for growing the line from 140 miles in length to 3,000 miles in length. Born in North Carolina to parents of Virginia stock, Buford grew up in Pittsylvania County, Virginia and attended the University of Virginia from 1846 to 1848, graduating with a Bachelor of Law. For the next decade, he practiced law in Pittsylvania and Danville and became the owner and editor of the Danville Register. These occupations were interrupted by a year's service in the Virginia House of Delegates in 1853.

When the Civil War broke out in Spring 1861, Buford enlisted in the Confederate States Army and was assigned to the Army of Northern Virginia, in which he served until Fall 1861. At that point, the residents of Pittsylvania County again elected him to the House of Delegates. During the war, Virginia Governor John Letcher brevetted Buford a lieutenant colonel in the Virginia militia. In this position, Buford watched over sick and injured Confederate troops at "Buford's Home" and forwarded important military supplies to soldiers on the front lines. After Appomattox in April 1865, Buford resigned from the legislature and returned to Danville. He was elected President of the Richmond and Danville Railroad on September 13, 1865 and consequently moved back to Richmond in early 1866.

Over the next two decades, Buford guided the railroad through its best years. In 1866, the R&D had 154 miles of track and $284,790 in profit. By 1886, it had grown to 2,670 miles of track and $1,767,662 in profit. Adjusting for deflation in the late 19th century, Buford delivered a 1,050% growth in profit over 20 years. In the course of those years, however, the controlling interests in the company became contrary to Buford's established policies of management and he tendered his resignation in late 1886.

For the next few years of his life, Buford devoted himself to the Virginia Agricultural and Mechanical Society and served as its president for four years. In 1893, he ran for governor of Virginia but was defeated by Charles T. O'Ferrall. He was also involved with the direction of the Merchants National Bank of Richmond. In 1911, Algernon S. Buford died at his home in Richmond and was buried at Hollywood Cemetery.

Early life (1826–1865) 
Buford was a graduate of the University of Virginia, and came to Chatham, Virginia, to enter the practice of law. His choice was understandable, since several illustrious attorneys had established practices in the town, including Whitmell Pugh Tunstall, who had been the creator and first president of the Richmond and Danville Railroad.

Buford was related to Tunstall. He was Tunstall's nephew-in-law and in manner of speaking, his brother-in-law as well. He married Emily Winifred Townes, daughter of George Townes and Eliza Barker Tunstall. Eliza was the older sister of Whitmell P. Tunstall, and had reared him after the death of their mother.

Buford represented Pittsylvania County in the Virginia House of Delegates during 1853 and 1854.

During the American Civil War, in 1863, Buford was in charge of the Virginia Depot, on 13th street, south of Cary Street, (Shockoe Slip), in Richmond. After the war, he became known as Col. Buford.

President of the Richmond and Danville Railroad (1865–1887) 
Over the next two decades, Buford guided the railroad through its best years. In 1866, the R&D had 154 miles of track, $672,714 in earnings, $284,790 in profit, 25 locomotives, and 285 total cars. By 1886, it had grown to 2,670 miles of track, $3,981,355 in earnings, $1,767,662 in profit, 126 locomotives, and 2,551 total cars. Adjusting for deflation in the late 19th century (i.e., converting 1866 USD to 1886 USD), the 1866 earnings decrease to $397,705 and profit decreases to $168,366. When the 1886 numbers are taken as percentages of the 1866 numbers, the growth rates in earnings and profit are given: 1,001% growth in earnings and 1,050% growth in profit.

With the support of Virginia Governor Francis H. Pierpont, on September 13, 1865, Colonel Buford became president of the  Richmond and Danville Railroad (R&D). Damage from the war, including the bridge across the James River between Manchester and Richmond was repaired.

Over the next 20 years, as R&D President, Col. Buford extended the trackage to three thousand miles. The R&D's early acquisitions included the Piedmont Railroad in 1866, and the North Carolina Railroad in 1871.

In 1872, the R&D extended aid to the Atlanta and Richmond Air Line Railway to help it complete its road between Charlotte and Atlanta. The line was to become a key link in the "Piedmont Air Line,” a system of railroads across the southeast.

In 1878, the R&D acquired the Charlotte, Columbia and Augusta Railroad.

In 1880, the Richmond and West Point Terminal Railway and Warehouse Company was chartered to acquire railroads which the R&D could not acquire directly due to a limitation in its charter. One of these was the former Richmond and York River Railroad.

In 1881, the R&D leased the Piedmont Air Line system, by then renamed Atlanta and Charlotte Air Line Railway, forming the Richmond and Danville Railroad System.

In 1885, the R&D bought the Lawrenceville-to-Suwanee line in Georgia from the Lawrenceville Branch Railroad. This line was sold to the Atlanta and Charlotte Air Line Railway in 1908, and was abandoned in 1920.

The R&D leased the  North Eastern Railroad (Georgia) in 1886. In 1887, the Terminal Company gained control of the East Tennessee, Virginia and Georgia Railway.

In 1888, the Terminal Company purchased the entire capital stock of the Georgia Company, which held a controlling interest in the Central Railroad and Banking Company. In 1889, the  Georgia Pacific Railway was completed and began operation from Atlanta to Greenville, Mississippi. It had been leased to the R&D in January of that year.

In 1890, the Terminal Company acquired a controlling interest in the Alabama Great Southern Railroad.

By 1890, the R&D System covered  of track in Virginia, North Carolina, South Carolina, Georgia, Tennessee, Alabama, Mississippi, Arkansas, and Texas. However, the R&D System had become financially unstable during all the growth. In 1892, the R&D and subsidiaries entered receivership.

In 1980, Southern Railway Company later became part of Norfolk Southern Railway.

After the R&D (1887–1911) 
After his retirement from the presidency of the Richmond and Danville, Buford remained active in Richmond society. On the night of May 6, 1911, Colonel Buford died at his residence at 20 West Franklin Street in Richmond. His funeral was held on May 8 at Broad Street Methodist Church, which he had attended for many years.

Family 
Buford married three times. His first marriage was to Emily Whitmell Townes (1830–1859) of Pittsylvania in December 1854, with whom he had three daughters: Elizabeth T. "Lizzie" (1856–1859), Susan A. (1857–1859), and Emily Townes (1859–1938), married Col. Clement E. Manly (1853–1928) of North Carolina. Emily died in November 1859 and Buford remarried to Kate Aubrey Wortham (1843–1875) of Richmond in December 1869. They had two daughters: Catherine "Kate" Thomas (1871–1963), married Walter T. L. Livingston (1871–1930); and Elizabeth "Lizzie" Gilmer (1873–1880). After Kate's death in 1875, Buford remarried for the third and final time to Mary Cameron Strother (née Ross, 1848–1916), the widow of Robert Q. Strother (1844–1873), in May 1879. They had three children: Algernon Sidney, Jr. (1880–1951), married Elisabeth Lanier Dunn (1884–1980); Mary Ross (1883–1962), married Frederick E. Nolting (1872–1955); and William Erskine (1887–1954), married Sarah Sergeant Oppenheimer (1894–1972).

Legacy 

Col. Buford personally (as well as through the Richmond and Danville Railroad) was much involved in the development of the community, originally known as Brown's Summit, later renamed Grand Summit, and eventually renamed again Bon Air), derived from the French expression for good air. In 1877, he was among the first investors and officers in the Bon Air Land and Improvement Company. Other R&D officials involved in the development of Bon Air were General Thomas M. Logan, Col.  Andrew Talcott, and Talcott's son, Thomas Mann Randolph Talcott. Among Bon Air's residents of the period was druggist Polk Miller, who founded Sergeant's Pet Care Products and became a notable musician.

Buford is memorialized by the naming of the thoroughfare Buford Road in Bon Air, Virginia.

Buford, Georgia, a town (and later a city) on a portion for the Richmond and Danville Railroad system was named for him.

References

Further reading

External links
Southern Railway Historical Association
A.S. Buford

1829 births
1911 deaths
19th-century American railroad executives
University of Virginia alumni
People from Chatham, Virginia
People from Bon Air, Virginia
Politicians from Richmond, Virginia